The Late Show with Stephen Colbert is an American late-night talk show and it airs weeknights at 11:35 pm Eastern/10:35 pm Central on CBS in the United States. The hour-long show has aired since September 8, 2015, and is hosted by actor, comedian and critic Stephen Colbert, an alumnus of The Daily Show and former host of The Colbert Report.  Jazz musician Jon Batiste and his band Stay Human serve as the show's house band. A total of  episodes have aired. Beginning on March 30, 2020, Colbert began filming the show from home due to the theatrical shutdown ordered by New York City mayor Bill de Blasio in the wake of the 2019–20 coronavirus pandemic in the United States.

Episodes

2015

2016

2017

2018

2019

2020

2021

2022

2023

External links
 
 Lineups at Interbridge 
 

Late Show with Stephen Colbert
Late Show with Stephen Colbert
Episodes